The Women's Royal Air Force (WRAF) was the women's branch of the Royal Air Force, existing from 1 April 1918 until 1 April 1920, when it was disbanded. Its original intent was to provide female mechanics in order to free up men for front line service in World War I. However, the organisation saw high enrolment, with women also serving in a number of other non-combatant roles, including drivers, caterers, clerks and tailors, as well as filling other wartime needs.

Its last veteran was for a time thought to be Gladys Powers, who died in 2008, but Florence Green, who died in February 2012, was subsequently found to be the last-known surviving WRAF veteran.

The name was revived in 1949 for the regular women's branch of the RAF. The auxiliary organisation in the Second World War had been called the Women's Auxiliary Air Force.

Strength
The target strength had been a force of around 90,000. Figures are unreliable until 1 August 1918, when the strength was 15,433, approximately 5,000 recruits and 10,000 transferred from the predecessor organisations, mainly the Queen Mary's Army Auxiliary Corps, but also the Women's Royal Naval Service. The organisation never exceeded 25,000.

Depots
Depots were opened in 1918 at Handsworth College, in Glasgow, at RAF Flowerdown and at York.

List of Commandants 
Gertrude Crawford, 1918
Violet Douglas-Pennant, May–September 1918
Helen Gwynne-Vaughan, September 1918 – 1920

Notes

External links

 
Search and download Service records of women who joined the WRAF, 1914–1919 from The National Archives.

Royal Air Force
All-female military units and formations
 
Military units and formations established in 1918
Sex segregation
1918 establishments in the United Kingdom
1920 disestablishments in the United Kingdom
Women's organisations based in the United Kingdom